Antonio Rodríguez Ferrer (August 23, 1864 – October 22, 1935) was a Cuban composer and band conductor.

In 1898, he became composer of the musical introductory notes to the Cuban national anthem. He was a professor of music and conducted choirs and bands.  Besides composing music for bands, he composed two symphonies, Preludio Tematico and Fantasia, and a series of Danzas Cubanas for piano.  In 1918, he was awarded the prize for music by the National Academy of Arts and Letters.  His nephew, Jorge Gustavo Armando Rodriguez-Gonzalez (1889–1966) was also a composer/musician and his great-grandnephew is the writer/lawyer Clemente G. Gomez-Rodriguez.

References
  Sucesivas Ediciones y Extranjerismos Introducidos en el Himno, Diario de la Marina, November 11, 1954 article
 Symbols of the Cuban Nation article 
 Symbols of the Cuban Nation article 

1864 births
1935 deaths
Cuban composers
Male composers
National anthem writers
Cuban male musicians